The Jesus Prayer, also known as The Prayer, is a short formulaic prayer, esteemed and advocated especially in Eastern Christianity: "Lord Jesus Christ, Son of God, have mercy on me, a sinner."  The prayer has been widely taught and discussed throughout the history of the Orthodox Church. The ancient and original form did not include the words "a sinner", which were added later. It is often repeated continually as a part of personal ascetic practice, its use being an integral part of the eremitic tradition of prayer known as hesychasm. The prayer is particularly esteemed by the spiritual fathers of this tradition (see Philokalia) as a method of cleaning and opening up the mind and after this the heart, brought about first by the Prayer of the Mind, or more precisely the Noetic Prayer, and after this the Prayer of the Heart. The Prayer of the Heart is considered to be the Unceasing Prayer that the Apostle Paul advocates in the New Testament. Theophan the Recluse regarded the Jesus Prayer stronger than all other prayers by virtue of the power of the Holy Name of Jesus.

Though identified more closely with Eastern Christianity, the prayer is found in Western Christianity in the Catechism of the Catholic Church. It also is used in conjunction with the recent innovation of Anglican prayer beads.

The Eastern Orthodox theology of the Jesus Prayer as enunciated in the 14th century by Gregory Palamas was generally rejected by Latin Church theologians until the 20th century. Pope John Paul II called Gregory Palamas a saint, a great writer, and an authority on theology. He also spoke with appreciation of hesychasm as "that deep union of grace which Eastern theology likes to describe with the particularly powerful term "theosis", 'divinization, and likened the meditative quality of the Jesus Prayer to that of the Catholic Rosary.

Origins
The prayer's origin is the Egyptian desert, which was settled by the monastic Desert Fathers and Desert Mothers in the 5th century. It was found inscribed in the ruins of a cell from that period in the Egyptian desert.

A formula similar to the standard form of the Jesus Prayer is found in a letter attributed to John Chrysostom, who died in AD 407. This "Letter to an Abbot" speaks of "Lord Jesus Christ, son of God, have mercy" and "Lord Jesus Christ, son of God, have mercy on us" being used as ceaseless prayer. However, some consider this letter dubious or spurious and attribute it to an unknown writer of unknown date.

What may be the earliest explicit reference to the Jesus Prayer in a form that is similar to that used today is in Discourse on Abba Philimon from the Philokalia. Philimon lived around AD 600. The version cited by Philimon is, "Lord Jesus Christ, Son of God, have mercy upon me," which is apparently the earliest source to cite this standard version. While the prayer itself was in use by that time, John S. Romanides writes that "We are still searching the Fathers for the term 'Jesus prayer'."

A similar idea is recommended in the Ladder of Divine Ascent of John Climacus (circa 523–606), who recommends the regular practice of a monologistos, or one-worded "Jesus Prayer". The use of the Jesus Prayer according to the tradition of the Philokalia is the subject of the 19th century anonymous Russian spiritual classic The Way of a Pilgrim, also in the original form, without the addition of the words "a sinner".

Though the Jesus Prayer has been practiced through the centuries as part of the Eastern tradition, in the 20th century, it also began to be used in some Western churches, including some Latin Catholic and Anglican churches.

Theology

The hesychastic practice of the Jesus Prayer is founded on the biblical view by which God's name is conceived as the place of his presence. Orthodox mysticism has no images or representations. The mystical practice (the prayer and the meditation) doesn't lead to perceiving representations of God (see below Palamism). Thus, the most important means of a life consecrated to praying is the invoked name of God, as it is emphasized since the 5th century by the Thebaid anchorites, or by the later Athonite hesychasts. For the Orthodox the power of the Jesus Prayer comes not only from its content, but from the very invocation of Jesus' name.

Scriptural roots
The Jesus Prayer combines three Bible verses: the Christological hymn of the Pauline epistle Philippians  (verse 11: "Jesus Christ is Lord"), the Annunciation of Luke  (verse 35: "Son of God"), and the Parable of the Pharisee and the Publican of Luke , in which the Pharisee demonstrates the improper way to pray (verse 11: "God, I thank thee, that I am not as other men are, extortioners, unjust, adulterers, or even as this publican"), whereas the Publican prays correctly in humility (verse 13: "God be merciful to me a sinner").

Palamism, the underlying theology

The essence–energies distinction, a central principle in Orthodox theology, was first formulated by Gregory of Nyssa and developed by Gregory Palamas in the 14th century in support of the mystical practices of Hesychasm and against Barlaam of Seminara. It stands that God's essence (ousia) is distinct from God's energies, his manifestations in the world, by which men can experience the Divine. The energies are "unbegotten" or "uncreated". They were revealed in various episodes of the Bible: the burning bush seen by Moses, the Light on Mount Tabor at the Transfiguration. "Palamas […] taught that the ascetic endeavor of fasting and prayer, particularly the practice of the Jesus Prayer according to the teachings of the hesychastic Fathers, prepares one to receive the grace-filled light of the Lord, which is like that which shone on Mt. Tabor at the Lord's Transfiguration. In other words, if God wills, according to one's striving, one can partake of divine blessedness while still on this sinful earth."

Apophatism (negative theology) is the main characteristic of the Eastern theological tradition. Incognoscibility is not conceived as agnosticism or refusal to know God, because the Eastern theology is not concerned with abstract concepts; it is contemplative, with a discourse on things above rational understanding. Therefore, dogmas are often expressed antinomically. This form of contemplation is experience of God, illumination, called the vision of God or, in Greek, theoria.

Repentance in Eastern Orthodoxy

The Eastern Orthodox Church holds a non-juridical view of sin, by contrast to the satisfaction view of atonement for sin as articulated in the West, firstly by Anselm of Canterbury (as debt of honor)) and Thomas Aquinas (as a moral debt). The terms used in the East are less legalistic (grace, punishment), and more medical (sickness, healing) with less exacting precision. Sin, therefore, does not carry with it the guilt for breaking a rule, but rather the impetus to become something more than what men usually are. One repents not because one is or isn't virtuous, but because human nature can change. Repentance (metanoia, "changing one's mind") isn't remorse, justification, or punishment, but a continual enactment of one's freedom, deriving from renewed choice and leading to restoration (the return to man's original state). This is reflected in the Mystery of Confession for which, not being limited to a mere confession of sins and presupposing recommendations or penalties, it is primarily that the priest acts in his capacity of spiritual father. The Mystery of Confession is linked to the spiritual development of the individual, and relates to the practice of choosing an elder to trust as his or her spiritual guide, turning to him for advice on the personal spiritual development, confessing sins, and asking advice.

As stated at the local Council of Constantinople in 1157, Christ brought his redemptive sacrifice not to the Father alone, but to the Trinity as a whole. In the Eastern Orthodox theology redemption isn't seen as ransom. It is the reconciliation of God with man, the manifestation of God's love for humanity. Thus, it is not the anger of God the Father but His love that lies behind the sacrificial death of his son on the cross.

The redemption of man is not considered to have taken place only in the past, but continues to this day through theosis. The initiative belongs to God, but presupposes man's active acceptance (not an action only, but an attitude), which is a way of perpetually receiving God.

Distinctiveness from analogues in other religions
The practice of contemplative or meditative chanting is known in several religions including Buddhism, Hinduism, and Islam (e.g. japa, zikr). The form of internal contemplation involving profound inner transformations affecting all the levels of the self is common to the traditions that posit the ontological value of personhood. The history of these practices, including their possible spread from one religion to another, is not well understood. Such parallels (like between unusual psycho-spiritual experiences, breathing practices, postures, spiritual guidances of elders, peril warnings) might easily have arisen independently of one another, and in any case must be considered within their particular religious frameworks.

Although some aspects of the Jesus Prayer may resemble some aspects of other traditions, its Christian character is central rather than mere "local color". The aim of the Christian practicing it is not limited to attaining humility, love, or purification of sinful thoughts, but rather it is becoming holy and seeking union with God (theosis), which subsumes all the aforementioned virtues. Thus, for the Eastern Orthodox:

 The Jesus Prayer is, first of all, a prayer addressed to God. It is not a means of self-deifying or self-deliverance, but a counterexample to Adam's pride, repairing the breach it produced between man and God.
 The aim is not to be dissolved or absorbed into nothingness or into God, or reach another state of mind, but to (re)unite with God (which by itself is a process) while remaining a distinct person.
 It is an invocation of Jesus' name, because Christian anthropology and soteriology are strongly linked to Christology in Orthodox monasticism.
 In a modern context the continuing repetition is regarded by some as a form of meditation, the prayer functioning as a kind of mantra. However, Orthodox users of the Jesus Prayer emphasize the invocation of the name of Jesus Christ that Hesychios describes in Pros Theodoulon which would be contemplation on the Triune God rather than simply emptying the mind.
 Acknowledging "a sinner" is to lead firstly to a state of humbleness and repentance, recognizing one's own sinfulness.
 Practicing the Jesus Prayer is strongly linked to mastering passions of both soul and body, e.g. by fasting. For the Eastern Orthodox it is not the body that is wicked, but "the bodily way of thinking"; therefore salvation also regards the body.
 Unlike "seed syllables" in particular traditions of chanting mantras, the Jesus Prayer may be translated into whatever language the pray-er customarily uses. The emphasis is on the meaning, not on the mere utterance of certain sounds.
 There is no emphasis on the psychosomatic techniques, which are merely seen as helpers for uniting the mind with the heart, not as prerequisites.

A magistral way of meeting God for the Orthodox, the Jesus Prayer does not harbor any secrets in itself, nor does its practice reveal any esoteric truths. Instead, as a hesychastic practice, it demands setting the mind apart from rational activities and ignoring the physical senses for the experiential knowledge of God. It stands along with the regular expected actions of the believer (prayer, almsgiving, repentance, fasting etc.) as the response of the Orthodox Tradition to Paul the Apostle's challenge to "pray without ceasing". It is also linked to the Song of Solomon's passage from the Old Testament: "I sleep, but my heart is awake" (Song of Solomon 5:2). The analogy being that as a lover is always conscious to his or her beloved, people can also achieve a state of "constant prayer" where they are always conscious of God's presence in their lives.

Practice
The practice of the Jesus Prayer is integrated into the mental, physical and spiritual ascesis undertaken by the Orthodox monastic in the practice of hesychasm. Yet the Jesus Prayer is not limited only to monastic life or to clergy. Anyone may practice this prayer, laypeople and clergy, men, women and children.

In the Eastern tradition the prayer is said or prayed repeatedly, often with the aid of a prayer rope, which is a cord, usually from wool or silk, tied with many knots. The prayer ropes usually have 33, 50, 100 or 300 knots – or, more generally, an easily divisible number. The person saying the prayer says one repetition for each knot. It may be accompanied by prostrations and the sign of the cross, signaled by beads strung along the prayer rope at intervals.
The prayer rope is "a tool of prayer" and an aid to beginners or those who face difficulties practicing the Prayer. However even the most advanced practitioners still use prayer ropes.

The Jesus Prayer may be practiced under the guidance and supervision of a spiritual guide (pneumatikos), and or Starets, especially when psychosomatic techniques (like rhythmical breath) are incorporated. A person that acts as a spiritual "father" and advisor may be an official certified by the Church Confessor (Pneumatikos Exolmologitis) or sometimes a spiritually experienced monk (called in Greek Gerontas (Elder) or in Russian Starets). It is possible for that person to be a layperson, usually a "practical theologician" (i.e. a person well versed in Orthodox theology but without official credentials, certificates, diplomas etc.).

Techniques
There are no fixed rules for those who pray, "the way there is no mechanical, physical or mental technique which can force God to show his presence" (Metropolitan Kallistos Ware).

In The Way of a Pilgrim, the pilgrim advises, "as you draw your breath in, say, or imagine yourself saying, 'Lord Jesus Christ,' and as you breathe again, 'have mercy on me.'" Another option is to say (orally or mentally) the whole prayer while breathing in and again the whole prayer while breathing out and yet another, to breathe in recite the whole prayer, breathe out while reciting the whole prayer again. One can also hold the breath for a few seconds between breathing in and out.

Monks may pray this prayer many hundreds of times each night as part of their private cell vigil ("cell rule"). Under the guidance of an Elder (Russian Starets; Greek Gerondas), the monk aims to internalize the prayer, so that he is praying unceasingly. Diadochos of Photiki refers in On Spiritual Knowledge and Discrimination to the automatic repetition of the Jesus Prayer, under the influence of the Holy Spirit, even in sleep. This state is regarded as the accomplishment of Paul the Apostle's exhortation to the Thessalonians to "pray without ceasing".

The Jesus Prayer can be used for a kind of "psychological" self-analysis. According to the Way of the Pilgrim account and Mount Athos practitioners of the Jesus Prayer, "one can have some insight on his or her current psychological situation by observing the intonation of the words of the prayer, as they are recited. Which word is stressed most. This self-analysis could reveal to the praying person things about their inner state and feelings, maybe not yet realised, of their unconsciousness."

"While praying the Jesus Prayer, one might notice that sometimes the word 'Lord' is pronounced louder, more stressed, than the others, like: Lord Jesus Christ, (Son of God), have mercy on me, (a/the sinner). In this case, they say, it means that our inner self is currently more aware of the fact that Jesus is the Lord, maybe because we need reassurance that he is in control of everything (and our lives too). Other times, the stressed word is 'Jesus': Lord Jesus Christ, (Son of God), have mercy on me, (a/the sinner). In that case, they say, we feel the need to personally appeal more to his human nature, the one that is more likely to understand our human problems and shortcomings, maybe because we are going through tough personal situations. Likewise if the word 'Christ' is stressed it could be that we need to appeal to Jesus as Messiah and Mediator, between humans and God the Father, and so on. When the word 'Son' is stressed maybe we recognise more Jesus' relationship with the Father. If 'of God' is stressed then we could realise more Jesus' unity with the Father. A stressed 'have mercy on me' shows a specific, or urgent, need for mercy. A stressed 'a sinner' (or 'the sinner') could mean that there is a particular current realisation of the sinful human nature or a particular need for forgiveness.

"In order to do this kind of self-analysis one should better start reciting the prayer relaxed and naturally for a few minutes so the observation won't be consciously 'forced', and then to start paying attention to the intonation as described above.

Also, a person might want to consciously stress one of the words of the prayer in particular when one wants to express a conscious feeling of situation. So in times of need stressing the 'have mercy' part can be more comforting or more appropriate. In times of failures, the 'a sinner' part, etc....)."

Levels of the prayer

Paul Evdokimov, a 20th-century Russian philosopher and theologian, writes about beginner's way of praying: initially, the prayer is excited because the man is emotive and a flow of psychic contents is expressed. In his view this condition comes, for the modern men, from the separation of the mind from the heart: "The prattle spreads the soul, while the silence is drawing it together." Old fathers condemned elaborate phraseologies, for one word was enough for the publican, and one word saved the thief on the cross. They only uttered Jesus' name by which they were contemplating God. For Evdokimov the acting faith denies any formalism which quickly installs in the external prayer or in the life duties; he quotes Seraphim of Sarov: "The prayer is not thorough if the man is self-conscious and he is aware he's praying."

"Because the prayer is a living reality, a deeply personal encounter with the living God, it is not to be confined to any given classification or rigid analysis" an on-line catechism reads. As general guidelines for the practitioner, different number of levels (3, 7 or 9) in the practice of the prayer are distinguished by Orthodox fathers. They are to be seen as being purely informative, because the practice of the Prayer of the Heart is learned under personal spiritual guidance in Eastern Orthodoxy which emphasizes the perils of temptations when it's done by one's own. Thus, Theophan the Recluse, a 19th-century Russian spiritual writer, talks about three stages:
 The oral prayer (the prayer of the lips) is a simple recitation, still external to the practitioner.
 The focused prayer, when "the mind is focused upon the words" of the prayer, "speaking them as if they were our own."
 The prayer of the heart itself, when the prayer is no longer something we do but who we are.
Once this is achieved the Jesus Prayer is said to become "self-active". It is repeated automatically and unconsciously by the mind, becoming an internal habit like a (beneficial) earworm. Body, through the uttering of the prayer, mind, through the mental repetition of the prayer, are thus unified with "the heart" (spirit) and the prayer becomes constant, ceaselessly "playing" in the background of the mind, like a background music, without hindering the normal everyday activities of the person.

More exactly, according with the experience of the ones which had reached at the level of unceasing prayer - for example the monks from Mount Athos but not only, this can be further divided in the Prayer of the Mind - level at which the prayer is said unceasingly in the rational parts (intellect - also called mind - and logic) of the soul and, if the practitioner advances further, then the grace will unite the rational parts with the irrational parts of the soul (inflammatory part and appetitive part) and then the prayer is called The Prayer of the Heart.

Others, like Father Archimandrite Ilie Cleopa, one of the most representative spiritual fathers of contemporary Romanian Orthodox monastic spirituality, talk about nine levels (see External links). They are the same path to theosis, more slenderly differentiated:
 The prayer of the lips.
 The prayer of the mouth.
 The prayer of the tongue.
 The prayer of the voice.
 The prayer of the mind.
 The prayer of the heart.
 The active prayer.
 The all-seeing prayer.
 The contemplative prayer.

In its more advanced use, the monk aims to attain to a sober practice of the Jesus Prayer in the heart free of images. It is from this condition, called by John Climacus and Hesychios the "guard of the mind", that the monk is raised by the divine grace to contemplation.

Variants of repetitive formulas
A number of different repetitive prayer formulas have been attested in the history of Eastern Orthodox monasticism: the Prayer of St. Ioannikios the Great (754–846): "My hope is the Father, my refuge is the Son, my shelter is the Holy Ghost, O Holy Trinity, Glory unto You," the repetitive use of which is described in his Life; or the more recent practice of Nikolaj Velimirović.

Similarly to the flexibility of the practice of the Jesus Prayer, there is no imposed standardization of its form. The prayer can be from as short as "Lord, have mercy" (Kyrie eleison), "Have mercy on me" ("Have mercy upon us"), or even "Jesus", to its longer most common form. It can also contain a call to the Theotokos (Virgin Mary), or to the saints. The single essential and invariable element is Jesus' name.

 Lord Jesus Christ, Son of God, have mercy on me, a sinner. (a very common form) (Sometimes "" is translated "a sinner" but in Greek the article "" is a definite article, so it could be translated "the sinner".)
 Lord Jesus Christ, Son of God, have mercy on me. (a very common form in the Greek tradition)
 Lord Jesus Christ, have mercy on me. (common variant on Mount Athos) 
 Jesus, have mercy.
 Lord Jesus Christ, Son of God, have mercy on us.
 Lord Jesus Christ, Son of the living God, have mercy on me, a sinner.

In art
The Jesus Prayer is a core part of the plot in J. D. Salinger's pair of stories Franny and Zooey. Its use in that book is itself referenced in Jeffrey Eugenides's novel, The Marriage Plot.
The prayer is also a central theme of the 2006 Russian film Ostrov.
In 1999, Sir John Tavener wrote this haunting and somewhat discordant setting of ‘The Jesus Prayer’ for the popular Icelandic singer Björk. His song is titled ‘Prayer of the Heart’ which is an alternate name for ‘The Jesus Prayer.’ The music is played by the Brodsky Quartet. The Jesus Prayer repeats in Greek, in Coptic (the language of the desert fathers and mothers), and in English.

Catholic Church
Part four of the Catechism of the Catholic Church, which is dedicated to Christian prayer, devotes paragraphs 2665 to 2669 to prayer to Jesus.

In his poem The Book of the Twelve Béguines, John of Ruysbroeck, a 14th-century Flemish mystic beatified by Pope Pius X in 1908, wrote of "the uncreated Light, which is not God, but is the intermediary between Him and the 'seeing thought'" as illuminating the contemplative not in the highest mode of contemplation, but in the second of the four ascending modes.

Similar methods of prayer in use in the Catholic Church are recitation, as recommended by John Cassian, of "O God, come to my assistance; O Lord, make haste to help me" or other verses of Scripture; repetition of a single monosyllabic word, as suggested by the Cloud of Unknowing; the method used in Centering Prayer; the method used by The World Community for Christian Meditation, based on the Aramaic invocation Maranatha; the use of Lectio Divina; etc.

The Catechism of the Catholic Church says:

Use by other Christians
In addition to Roman Catholics and Eastern Orthodox, many Christians of other traditions also use the Jesus Prayer, primarily as a centering prayer or for contemplative prayer. The prayer is sometimes used with the Anglican rosary. The structure and content of the Jesus Prayer also bears a resemblance to the "Sinner's Prayer" used by many evangelical Protestants.

See also

 Cardiognosis
 Catholic prayers to Jesus
 Christian prayer
 Fatima Prayer
 High Priestly Prayer
 Imiaslavie
 Japa
 Poustinia
 Prayer beads
 Rosary
 Sacred heart
 Tabor Light

Notes

References

External links
Norris Chumley’s documentary film,  Mysteries of the Jesus Prayer
What is the “Jesus Prayer”, the “Prayer of the mind” and the “Prayer of the heart”? (from Mount Athos)
The Jesus Prayer by Steven Peter Tsichlis (Greek Orthodox Archdiocese of America)
Saying the Jesus Prayer by Albert S Rossi (St. Vladimir's Orthodox Theological Seminary)
The Jesus Prayer by Metropolitan Anthony Bloom
On Practicing the Jesus Prayer by Ignatius Brianchaninov
Introduction to the Jesus Prayer by Mother Alexandra
Prayer of Jesus or Prayer of the Heart by Jonah Mourtos
The Power of the Name by Bishop Kallistos of Diokleia
Becoming the Jesus Prayer by Michael Plekon
The Jesus Prayer by Ken E. Norian, TSSF
 The Jesus Prayer: Learning to Pray from the Heart, by Per-Olof Sjögren, trans. by Sydney Linton; First Triangle ed. (London: Triangle, 1986, cop. 1975) 
Hieromonk Ilie Cleopa preaching on the levels of the Prayer of the Heart (video)
The Psychological Basis of Mental Prayer in the Heart (online book) by Theophanes (Constantine)
The Jesus Prayer A site for gazing (English and Greek)
Russian tradition in worship of God's Name and the Jesus Prayer 
On the Jesus Prayer Greek site in English with practical advice.
"Death to the World" an Orthodox Ascetic Website.
Praying the Jesus Prayer Guide for practice and numerous articles
The Jesus Prayer  Eastern Orthodox Christian library that provides access to selected resources about the Jesus Prayer.
 Psellos commentary on Jesus Prayer

Christian prayer
Christian terminology
Eastern Orthodox liturgy
Hesychasm
Meditation
Language and mysticism
Religious formulas